Deep in My Soul is Smokey Robinson's fifth solo album. It was released in 1977.

Critical reception 
Reviewing in Christgau's Record Guide: Rock Albums of the Seventies (1981), Robert Christgau wrote:

Track listing

"Vitamin U" (Lawrence Brown, Terri McFaddin) – 4:30
"There Will Come a Day (I'm Gonna Happen to You)" (Michael B. Sutton, Brenda Sutton, Kathy Wakefield) – 3:54
"It's Been a Long Time (Since I Been in Love)" (Elliot Willensky) – 3:43
"Let's Do The Dance of Life Together" (Elliot Willensky) – 3:46
"If You Want My Love" (Donald Charles Baldwin, Jeffrey Bowen) – 3:45
"You Cannot Laugh Alone" (Donald Charles Baldwin, Jeffrey Bowen) – 4:43
"In My Corner" (Victor Orsborn, Eric Robinson) – 4:43
"The Humming Song (Lost for Words)" (Bobby Belle, Art Posey, Josef Powell) – 3:29

Personnel 
Smokey Robinson – vocals
Technical
Berry Gordy - executive producer
Antonín Kratochvíl - photography

References

External links 
 

Smokey Robinson albums
1977 albums
Albums produced by Hal Davis
Albums produced by Jeffrey Bowen
Motown albums